Ibtisam Youssef Khalil Al-Nawafleh (born 1967) is a Jordanian politician from Ma'an Governorate. She is a member of the House of Representatives.

See also 

 18th Parliament of Jordan

References 

Living people

1967 births
21st-century Jordanian politicians
21st-century Jordanian women politicians
Members of the House of Representatives (Jordan)
People from Ma'an Governorate